State Highway 151 (abbreviated SH-151 or OK-151) runs  across Keystone Dam in northeastern Oklahoma. Its entire length is within Tulsa County. The route has no lettered spur routes.

SH-151 was ostensibly assigned to Keystone Dam upon its completion in 1964.

Route description
State Highway 151 begins at a trumpet interchange with SH-51 east of Mannford.  While elevated from this interchange, the highway crosses the BNSF Railway. SH-151, running north-northeast, then serves as the eastern boundary of Keystone State Park. It then runs across the top of Keystone Dam; on the west side of the dam lies Keystone Lake, while on the east side is the Arkansas River. After crossing the dam, the route ends at US-64/US-412 at another trumpet interchange, west of Sand Springs.

History
Keystone Dam was completed in 1964. The dam was first shown as a state highway on the 1965 state highway map. No SH-151 shield was shown on this map, however; presumably it was omitted for space reasons. The highway would remain unlabeled on the official state maps until the 2008 edition.

Junction list

References

External links

SH-151 at OKHighways
SH-151 at Roadklahoma

151
Transportation in Tulsa County, Oklahoma